The David di Donatello Award for Best Supporting Actor is a film award presented by the Accademia del Cinema Italiano (ACI, Academy of Italian Cinema) to recognize the outstanding performance in a supporting role of an actor who has worked within the Italian film industry during the year preceding the ceremony. It has been awarded every year since 1981.

Actors Giuseppe Battiston and Leo Gullotta are the record holders in this category, with three awards each.

Winners and nominees
Below, winners are listed first in the colored row, followed by other nominees.

1980s

1990s

2000s

2010s

See also 
 Nastro d'Argento for Best Supporting Actor
 Cinema of Italy

References

External links
 
 Daviddidonatello.it (official website)

David di Donatello
Film awards for supporting actor